Hermann Buchfelder (born 21 December 1889, date of death unknown) was an Austrian water polo player. He competed in the men's tournament at the 1912 Summer Olympics.

References

1889 births
Year of death missing
Austrian male water polo players
Olympic water polo players of Austria
Water polo players at the 1912 Summer Olympics
Sportspeople from Vienna